Gaeotis is a genus of air-breathing land semi-slugs, terrestrial pulmonate gastropod mollusks in the family Amphibulimidae.

Distribution 

The genus Gaeotis is endemic to Puerto Rico.

Species 
Species within the genus Gaeotis include:
 Gaeotis albopunctulata Shuttleworth, 1854
 Gaeotis flavolineata Shuttleworth, 1854
 Gaeotis malleata Pilsbry, 1899
 Gaeotis nigrolineata Shuttleworth, 1854 - type species of the genus Gaeotis

References

External links

Amphibulimidae